Maria Maddalena Morelli Fernandez (17 March 1727, Pistoia – 8 November 1800, Florence), also known by the Arcadian pseudonym Corilla Olimpica, was a Florentine Italian poetess, improvisatrice, and musician. The official poetess to the grand ducal court in Florence (1765–75), she won fame as the foremost female performer of the improvised poetry then popular in Italy, and was controversially crowned with the laurel wreath on the Roman Capitol in 1776, an event later fictionalised by Madame de Staël in Corinne.

Life

Early life 
Maria Maddalena Morelli, born in Pistoia, in the Duchy of Florence, on 17 March 1727, was the daughter of the celebrated violinist Iacopo Morelli by his wife Caterina Caterina, née Buonamici. She was educated in the Salesian school of Pistoia, and moved to Florence in 1746, where she moved in literary circles and performed her own poetry and played the harpsichord and violin. Princess Vittoria Rospigliosi-Pallavicini took her with her to Rome and, at the age of about twenty, while in the custody of Michele Giuseppe Morei, she was ascribed to the Arcadia with the pastoral name Corilla Olimpica.

She then moved to Naples, and lived there from 1750 to 1760 under the protection of Faustina Pignatelli, Princess of Colobrano. In 1751, she dedicated the capitolo Dalle felici gloriose sponde to Pietro Metastasio, inviting the poet to an improvisation contest; although he declined the invitation, he gave a flattering opinion of the young poetess in a letter to the Countess of Sangro. In the same year, Morelli was welcomed into the Accademia degli Agiati in Rovereto under the anagrammatic pseudonym Madonna Damerilla. In 1753, she engaged in long-distance poetic competitions with Francesco Maria Zanotti, who sent her a sonnet on the study of geometry to which she replied with Rotta è la cetra e l'apollinea fronda, and with Giuseppe Passeri (Fileno amabile). In the same year, the capitolo directed to Metastasio was inserted in the Saggio di poesie scelte filosofiche ed eroiche (Florence 1753).

Marriage and travels 

During her stay in Naples, Morelli contracted marriage with a Spanish gentleman, assigned to the secretariat of war, Ferdinando Fernández, with whom she had a son, Angiolo. But soon after she separated from her husband, who remained with her son, and she returned to Rome to the Rospigliosi-Pallavicini family, of whom she had been a guest before her stay in Naples. The new Roman stay, however, did not last long and for unclear reasons Morelli suddenly left Rome in 1760. In the following years, travelling in Italy, she continued successfully to perform in poetic improvisations and, according to contemporary rumours, she was involved in love intrigues.

In Pisa, she met Giacomo Casanova, who left an admiring but circumspect portrait of the poetess in the Histoire de ma vie:I made the acquaintance of an Englishman, of whom I bought a travelling carriage. He took me to see Corilla, the celebrated poetess. She received me with great politeness, and was kind enough to improvise on several subjects which I suggested. I was enchanted, not so much with her grace and beauty, as by her wit and perfect elocution. How sweet a language sounds when it is spoken well and the expressions are well chosen. A language badly spoken is intolerable even from a pretty mouth, and I have always admired the wisdom of the Greeks who made their nurses teach the children from the cradle to speak correctly and pleasantly. […] Corilla was 'straba', like Venus as painted by the ancients—why, I cannot think, for however fair a squint-eyed woman may be otherwise, I always look upon her face as distorted. I am sure that if Venus had been in truth a goddess, she would have made the eccentric Greek, who first dared to paint her cross-eyed, feel the weight of her anger. I was told that when Corilla sang, she had only to fix her squinting eyes on a man and the conquest was complete; but, praised be God! she did not fix them on me.

In Siena, where Pietro Belli, hearing her improvise, dedicated a long song to her, Morelli founded the gallant and poetic order of the Cavalieri Olimpici. In Parma, she became friends with Giuseppe Maria Pagnini, and with Carlo Innocenzo Frugoni, who dedicated a sonnet to her. In Bologna, some of her verses were published under the name "Madonna Damerilla of the Accademia degli Agiati" in Per le chiarissime nozze del nobile uomo signor conte Prospero Ferdinando Ranuzzi Cospi […] con Maria Maddalena Grassi (Bologna 1763). She followed a noble of the Cornaro family to Venice, but was persuaded to return to Bologna by an adventurer, Giulio Perilli, who also asked for some money on loan which was never repaid.

In Bologna, she composed the song In lode della sac. m. imp.… Maria Teresa imperatrice regina… coronandosi …l'arciduca Giuseppe (Bologna 1764; 2nd ed., Venice 1765). The poem, brought to the Empress by Marshal Antonio Botta Adorno, was also appreciated by Metastasio, and earned her, the following year, an invitation to Innsbruck at the Imperial court. Morelli performed on the occasion of the wedding of Peter Leopold with Maria Luisa of Bourbon in Vienna. During the return trip, she met the Marquis Lorenzo Ginori in Bologna, with whom he established a lifelong bond of affectionate friendship.

Court poet 

Appointed court poet of the Grand Duchy of Tuscany, she settled in Florence in a house in Via della Forca (currently Via Ferdinando Zannetti), taking her sister Maria Giovanna with her. Minister Pompeo Neri dedicated the long dithyramb Tu se' il mio grande, e luminoso Apollo to her, urging her to abandon occasional poetry and to devote herself to civil poetry, but the invitation remained unheard. In the context of her official functions as court poet, she composed the Ode alla fecondità (Florence, 1767) for the birth of the daughter of Maria Luisa and Peter Leopold of Tuscany and, in 1768, improvised the sonnet Se quei, che tanto alla Città Latina for the Lenten sermon of Father Lorenzo Fusconi in Santa Croce.

Probably in 1769, upon his appointment as director of music at court, the Livorno composer Pietro Nardini began a long collaboration with Morelli, accompanying her with the violin in her performances. Morelli's only aria with the musical text that has survived, Sogno, ma te non miro, was collected by Karl Ludwig Fernow in the essay Über die Improvisatoren in his Römische Studien (Zürich, 1806). However, Charles Burney, who frequented the house of Morelli while visiting Florence in September 1770, has left an important testimony on the singular modalities of her performances: At another great accademia, at the house of Signor Domenico Baldigiani, I this evening met with the famous Improvvisatrice, Signora Madalena Morelli, commonly called La Corilla, who is likewise a scholar of Signor Nardini, on the violin; and afterwards I was frequently at her house†. († She has, almost every evening a conversazione, or assembly, which is much frequented by the foreigners, and men of letters, at Florence.) Besides her wonderful talent of speaking verses extempore upon any given subject, and being able to play a ripieno part, on the violin, in concert, she sings with a great deal of expression, and has a considerable share of execution.Long considered not attributable to Morelli due to its very free and unscrupulous content, the Anacreontic Ogni cura in abbandono (1772) is one of the few erotic compositions of the poet, together with the dithyramb Delirio amoroso. The fame of Morelli, through Alexej Orlow, who stayed in Livorno between 1770 and 1772, for whom she composed some triplets, and Baron Friedrich Melchior von Grimm, reached the Tsarina Catherine II, and Morelli composed an Ode in honour of the Russian Empress.

Coronation 

At the end of 1774, accompanied by the Marquis Lorenzo Ginori and Nardini, Morelli moved to Rome. The ground for the Roman return had been prepared by the abbot Giacinto Cerutti and by Prince Luigi Gonzaga of Castiglione in agreement with the abbot Gioacchino Pizzi, custode generale of the Arcadia. In the extraordinary general meeting of the Academy on 12 January 1775, Morelli was acclaimed and she improvised the sonnet Dopo tre lustri alfin mi guida Amore in her tank. Two other sonnets by Morelli recited in the Arcadia were dedicated to the god of Love, Passeggia pure baldanzosamente e Ritorna, o Amore, a impiagarmi il petto. On 9 February of the next year, Pizzi announced that the coronation would take place in the next meeting, which took place on 16 February. For the occasion, Morelli improvised a sonnet for the coronation of Pius VI, who had just been elected. The chronicle of the event was handed down to the press in the Adunanza tenuta dagli Arcadi per la coronazione della celebre pastorella Corilla Olimpica (Rome 1775).

Returning to Florence, she sent the epithalamium L'Ara d'amore to the Arcadia on the occasion of the acclamation of the wedding of Charles Emmanuel of Piedmont and Maria Clotilde (which was then published in Adunanza tenuta dagli Arcadi il 30 novembre 1775, Rome 1775). In the following autumn, she returned to Rome and was associated with the Roman nobility, the first step towards her coronation in the Campidoglio, an honour already reserved for another Tuscan improvisatore, Bernardino Perfetti, protected by Violante Beatrice of Bavaria, who had been crowned in 1725 under the protection of Giovanni Mario Crescimbeni.It was Pizzi who promoted the poetic coronation of Morelli in the Capitol, immediately provoking some opposition and the defection of some Arcadians who left the Academy to found another, called the Forti. Having obtained the consent of the Senate from Pizzi, Papal approval arrived on 10 July 1776. On 14 July it was established that Morelli would respond by improvising on twelve themes: sacred history and revealed religion, philosophy, morality, physics, metaphysics, heroic poetry, legislation, eloquence, mythology, harmony, fine arts, and pastoral poetry. The judges were elected and the tests established (on the evenings of the 2, 9, and 19 August), to be held in the house of Prince Gonzaga. Morelli passed the examination brilliantly, the twelve examiners issued a certification, and Pizzi reported the result to the Senate. The poetess was crowned in the Capitol on 31 August, late in the evening, to try to limit the protests of the opposite party. The ceremony took place not without disputes and the controversy involved, together with Morelli, Gonzaga, Pizzi, the Roman Senate, the Arcadia, and Pius VI himself. Collections of satirical compositions and slanderous pamphlets circulated throughout Italy. Abbot Roberto Pucci, author of a satirical drama on poetic coronation, was arrested with his accomplice, tried, and sentenced to death, but then pardoned after a few months in prison.

The hasty return to Florence after the coronation in the Campidoglio was not enough to stifle the scandal, and the controversies and satire soon reached Tuscany as well. Cerutti and Gonzaga, who had pushed the poetess, at first reluctant, to accept the Capitoline coronation, immediately abandoned her, leaving her alone to face criticism and ridicule. Disappointed and embittered, Morelli composed the sonnet Folle desio di ambizion fallace, while the Marquis Ginori commissioned Giovanni Zanobi Weber to produce a medal with the portrait of Corilla and an allusion to the episode (some savages, to represent the detractors of Corilla, shoot arrows which fall on themselves). Meanwhile, abbot Giovanni Cristofano Amaduzzi, the erudite compiler of the Effemeridi, sought to console Morelli from Rome with letters seasoned with common sense and affection, and the pair entertained a close correspondence until the abbot's death in 1792.

Many years later, the writer Giovanni La Cecilia provided an account, highly prejudiced against Morelli, of the controversial coronation:Leopold protected, and even loved a Maddalena Morelli, a wretched poetess, known by the name of Corilla Olimpica, whom he wanted honoured at his court and had her crowned in the Capitol in the manner of the ancient Corilla, and because he delegated to a Monsignor Maffei, Bishop of Monte Pulciano, dear to him, and to Pius VI, the task of promoting that ridiculous coronation at any cost, the Romans who welcomed the poetess with laughter and whistles, had the following satire posted against the infatuated Corillista: "Monsignor Maffei wants / That if Corilla passes with the laurel / No one shoots peels or tomatoes / You are under the penalty of bajocchi.The storm only began to subside in the following year. Following the publication of the Song for Catherine of Russia, she was invited to join the Imperial court in St. Petersburg. For a long time she was uncertain whether to accept her prestigious invitation but her climate and health convinced her to stay in Florence. The report of the coronation made by Amaduzzi (Venice 1777) was published in the Nuova raccolta di opuscoli by Angelo Calogerà, but the promised celebratory publication suffered worrying and inexplicable delays. Only in 1779, with the date of 30 June, did the Atti della solenne coronazione fatta in Campidoglio della insigne poetessa… Corilla Olimpica appear in print. In August of the same year, Zanobi Weber forged a new medal with the effigy of Corilla. The affair could be said to be closed, but her health conditions were still precarious, financial setbacks were added (she confided to Amaduzzi on 17 August 1779: "the Sicilians ate all the capital I had because I made an annuity with one of this lineage of Cain and he mocked me well") and a theft in her house deprived her of jewels and valuables. In autumn, Ippolito Pindemonte and Giuseppe Maria Pagnini went to visit her.

Later life 
Perhaps datable to the end of 1779, if it can be connected with the news that appeared in the gazettes of the commission of a painting with the same subject by Pompeo Batoni for the King of Portugal, is the elegy Al core di Gesù. Among Morelli's few religious compositions, it is a capitolo in Dante's terza rima, inspired by the devotion of the Sacred Heart according to the vision of Margaret Mary Alacoque, in which devotion and sensuality are skilfully mixed. The four sonnets published shortly thereafter are also of religious inspiration: Iddio, che impera a l’universo intero; Quando, alma mia, da la prigion dolente; Oimé infelice! Che più temo, o spero?; Santa Religion, dentro il mio core.

On 11 January 1780, Morelli was invited to improvise at court for the Archduchess of Milan, Maria Beatrice d'Este, wife of Ferdinand of Austria. To commemorate the death of the painter and Arcadian artist Anton Raphael Mengs, Pizzi asked her for some verses to be included in the collection: the poetess at first shied away, then proposed some while pretending not to be the author, fearing that the new style would not be appreciated by the Academy. Finally, it was only the sonnet Morte ruotando al Vaticano intorno that was included in the collection Per l'adunanza degli Arcadi in morte del cavalier Antonio Raffaele Mengs (Rome 1780). Other celebratory sonnets were composed by Morelli for the death of Maria Teresa, who died on 29 November 1780, and the succession of Joseph II (L'astro più bello che splendesse in terra; Tolto di mano alla superba morte). In 1782, she was awarded an annual pension of one hundred sequins by Empress Catherine II, and in September she met the Duchess of Parma, Maria Amalia of Habsburg. The following year, she arranged the marriage of her friend Lorenzo Ginori with Francesca Lisci and celebrated their wedding with the sonnet Questa, che t'offro sull'april degli anni. In August 1785, she improvised for the reigns Ferdinand IV and Carolina of the Two Sicilies on a visit to Florence and was invited to the court of Naples, where she spent the winter. She returned to Florence in the summer of the following year, after having stayed again in Rome, warmly welcomed by Cardinal Giuseppe Garampi and Ambassador Andrea Memmo, finally obtaining an audience from Pius VI.

She also commemorated with a sonnet the death of Frederick II of Prussia, in 1786. This was followed, in 1787, by a sonnet for the name day of the sovereign Maria Luisa (Dal dolce sonno appena io mi svegliai), and another for the birth of Ginori's son. Then came two sonnets for the victory won by the Russians over the Turks in 1788 (Quella che a Mosca e a Peterburgo impera e L'auguste navi che dal Russo Impero). For the wedding of her niece Melania with the painter Antonio Meucci, which took place on 16 November 1789, she composed the epithalamium Favole sono della gente Ascrea; for the death of Abbot Pizzi, in 1790, the sonnets Cetra, che fosti già gradito dono and In qual diverso aspetto, in negro ammanto. For the visit to Pistoia of the Grand Duke Ferdinand III and Luisa Amalia of Bourbon, in 1791, she improvised the sonnet Della Patria mi guida il Genio amato. In September of the same year, Ginori died, and Amaduzzi died in the following year.

Decline and death 
In 1793, Morelli invited the young poetess Teresa Bandettini Landucci (Amarilli Etrusca), in whom she recognised her worthy continuator, and improvised for her the sonnet Anglico e picciol dono which she accompanied with the gift of an English wallet. In 1794, Bodoni printed the sonnet O dell'alma natura imitatrice, dedicated Alla nobilissima e valorosissima dama miss Cornelia Knight, which is perhaps to be considered her last work. Struck by apoplexy in 1797, she lived for three more years. In 1798, her husband died; he was then a colonel and governor of the Orbetello garrison. On June 15, 1799, Morelli dictated her will. As a sign of devotion, and following the example of Bernardino Perfetti, she offered her poetic crown to the Madonna dell'Umiltà.

Morelli died in Florence on 8 November 1800 and was buried in the oratory of San Francesco di Paola. General Sextius Alexandre François de Miollis, commander of the French troops in Florence, decreed her solemn honours to be held at the Accademia Fiorentina.

Legacy 
Unlike most impromptu poets, Morelli never wanted to collect her compositions for printing. Proud of her talent but also respectful of the peculiarities and limits of her art, she was fully aware of the impossibility of preserving its value intact outside the public performance, far from that aura of enthusiasm and mutual exaltation that united the improvisatore to his listeners. Considered the best improvisatrice of her time, of a free and independent character, the first and only woman to be crowned in the Capitol and to become a court poet, she was taken as a model by generations of poetesses, and her life inspired Madame de Staël's novel Corinne, or Italy (Paris 1807).

Notes

References

Citations

Bibliography 
 Ademollo, Alessandro (1887). Corilla Olimpica. Florence: C. Ademollo.
 Burney, Charles (1771). The Present State of Music in France and Italy. London: T. Becket & Co.
 Caesar, Michael (2005). "Improvised poetry". In The Oxford Companion to Italian Literature. Oxford: Oxford University Press.
 Catucci, Marco (2012). "MORELLI, Maria Maddalena". Dizionario Biografico degli Italiani. Vol. 75. (Treccani.it)
 Goldberger, Avriel H., trans. (1987). Madame de Staël (1807). Corinne, or, Italy. New Brunswick N.J.: Rutgers University Press. 
 La Cecilia, Giovanni (1861). Storie segrete delle famiglie reali. Vol. 4. Genoa: Cecchi & Armanino.
 Lindon, John (2005). "Morelli Fernandez, Maria Maddalena". The Oxford Companion to Italian Literature. Oxford: Oxford University Press.
 Machen, Arthur, trans. (1902). The Memoirs of Jacques Casanova de Seingalt. Vol. 4. New York: G. Putnam's Sons; London: Elek Books.
 Mardikes, Catherine, ed. (2010). "Morelli, Maria Maddalena, 1727?-1800". Italian Women Writers. University of Chicago Library.
 Natali, Giulio (1934). "MORELLI, Maria Maddalena". Enciclopedia Italiana. (Treccani.it)
 "Morèlli, Maria Maddalena" (2014). Enciclopedia on line. (Treccani.it)

1727 births
1800 deaths
Italian women poets
18th-century Italian women writers